Hajra is a female given name. The origin of the name is Arabic 'هاجر' (Hajar). It is one of the spellings of Hagar, the second wife of Prophet Ibrahim (Abrahim) who bore Ibraham's first son Ismail. Although the origins of this name mean sunlight, this name is the basis for Hajj, the (annual) pilgrimage to Mecca performed by Muslims.

This is a common female first name used in the context of the Muslim South Asian diaspora.

Notable people with the name include:
Hajrah Begum, Indian politician
Hajra Khan (actress), Pakistani actress
Hajra Khan (footballer), Pakistani footballer
Hajra Masroor, Pakistani feminist writer
Hajra Waheed, Canadian artist
Hajra Yamin, Pakistani actress

See also
 Hagar in Islam

References

Arabic feminine given names
Bosnian feminine given names
Pakistani feminine given names